The coast, also known as the coastline or seashore, is defined as the area where land meets the ocean, or as a line that forms the boundary between the land and the coastline. Shores are influenced by the topography of the surrounding landscape, as well as by water induced erosion, such as waves. The geological composition of rock and soil dictates the type of shore which is created. Coasts are important zones in natural ecosystems, often home to a wide range of biodiversity. On land, they harbor important ecosystems such as freshwater or estuarine wetlands, which are important for bird populations and other terrestrial animals. In wave-protected areas they harbor saltmarshes, mangroves or seagrasses, all of which can provide nursery habitat for finfish, shellfish, and other aquatic species. Rocky shores are usually found along exposed coasts and provide habitat for a wide range of sessile animals (e.g. mussels, starfish, barnacles) and various kinds of seaweeds. In physical oceanography, a shore is the wider fringe that is geologically modified by the action of the body of water past and present, while the beach is at the edge of the shore, representing the intertidal zone where there is one.

According to a United Nations atlas, 44% of all people live within 150 km (93 mi) of the sea. Because of their importance in society and high concentration of population, the coast is important for major parts of the global food and economic system, and they provide many ecosystem services to humankind. For example, important human activities happen in port cities. Coastal fisheries (commercial, recreational, and subsistence) and aquaculture are major economic activities and create jobs, livelihoods, and protein for the majority of coastal human populations. Other coastal spaces like beaches and seaside resorts generate large revenues through tourism. Marine coastal ecosystems can also provide protection against sea level rise and tsunamis. In many countries, mangroves are the primary source of wood for fuel (e.g. charcoal) and building material. Coastal ecosystems like mangroves and seagrasses have a much higher capacity for carbon sequestration than many terrestrial ecosystems, and as such can play a critical role in the near-future to help mitigate climate change effects by uptake of atmospheric anthropogenic carbon dioxide. 

However, the economic importance of coasts makes many of these communities vulnerable to climate change, which causes increases in extreme weather and sea level rise, and related issues such as coastal erosion, saltwater intrusion and coastal flooding. Other coastal issues, such as marine pollution, marine debris, coastal development, and marine ecosystem destruction, further complicate the human uses of the coast and threaten coastal ecosystems. The interactive effects of climate change, habitat destruction, overfishing and water pollution (especially eutrophication) have led to the demise of coastal ecosystem around the globe. This has resulted in population collapse of fisheries stocks, loss of biodiversity, increased invasion of alien species, and loss of healthy habitats. International attention to these issues has been captured in Sustainable Development Goal 14 "Life Below Water" which sets goals for international policy focused on preserving marine coastal ecosystems and supporting more sustainable economic practices for coastal communities. Likewise, the United Nations has declared 2021-2030 the UN Decade on Ecosystem Restoration, but restoration of coastal ecosystems has received insufficient attention.

Because coasts are constantly changing, a coastline's exact perimeter cannot be determined; this measurement challenge is called the coastline paradox. The term coastal zone is used to refer to a region where interactions of sea and land processes occur. Both the terms coast and coastal are often used to describe a geographic location or region located on a coastline (e.g., New Zealand's West Coast, or the East, West, and Gulf Coast of the United States.) Coasts with a narrow continental shelf that are close to the open ocean are called pelagic coast, while other coasts are more sheltered coast in a gulf or bay. A shore, on the other hand, may refer to parts of land adjoining any large body of water, including oceans (sea shore) and lakes (lake shore).

Size

Coastal habitats, which extend to the margins of the continental shelves, make up about 7 percent of the Earth's oceans, but at least 85% of commercially harvested fish depend on coastal environments during at least part of their life cycle. As of October 2010, about 2.86% of exclusive economic zones were part of marine protected areas.

The definition of coasts varies. Marine scientists think of the "wet" (aquatic or intertidal) vegetated habitats as being coastal ecosystems (including seagrass, salt marsh etc.) whilst some terrestrial scientist might only think of coastal ecosystems as purely terrestrial plants that live close to the seashore (see also estuaries and coastal ecosystems).

While there is general agreement in the scientific community regarding the definition of coast, in the political sphere, the delineation of the extents of a coast differ according to jurisdiction. Government authorities in various countries may define coast differently for economic and social policy reasons.

Exact length of coastline

Formation 

Tides often determine the range over which sediment is deposited or eroded. Areas with high tidal ranges allow waves to reach farther up the shore, and areas with lower tidal ranges produce deposition at a smaller elevation interval. The tidal range is influenced by the size and shape of the coastline. Tides do not typically cause erosion by themselves; however, tidal bores can erode as the waves surge up the river estuaries from the ocean.

The distinction between macrotidal and mesotidal coasts is more important. Macrotidal coasts lack barrier islands and lagoons, and are characterized by funnel-shaped estuaries containing sand ridges aligned with tidal currents. Wave action is much more important for determining bedforms of sediments deposited along mesotidal and microtidal coasts than in macrotidal coasts.

Waves erode coastline as they break on shore releasing their energy; the larger the wave the more energy it releases and the more sediment it moves. Coastlines with longer shores have more room for the waves to disperse their energy, while coasts with cliffs and short shore faces give little room for the wave energy to be dispersed. In these areas, the wave energy breaking against the cliffs is higher, and air and water are compressed into cracks in the rock, forcing the rock apart, breaking it down. Sediment deposited by waves comes from eroded cliff faces and is moved along the coastline by the waves. This forms an abrasion or cliffed coast.

Sediment deposited by rivers is the dominant influence on the amount of sediment located in the case of coastlines that have estuaries. Today, riverine deposition at the coast is often blocked by dams and other human regulatory devices, which remove the sediment from the stream by causing it to be deposited inland. Coral reefs are a provider of sediment for coastlines of tropical islands.

Like the ocean which shapes them, coasts are a dynamic environment with constant change. The Earth's natural processes, particularly sea level rises, waves and various weather phenomena, have resulted in the erosion, accretion and reshaping of coasts as well as flooding and creation of continental shelves and drowned river valleys (rias).

Importance for humans and ecosystems

Human settlements 

More and more of the world's people live in coastal regions. According to a United Nations atlas, 44% of all people live within 150 km (93 mi) of the sea. Many major cities are on or near good harbors and have port facilities. Some landlocked places have achieved port status by building canals.

Nations defend their coasts against military invaders, smugglers and illegal migrants. Fixed coastal defenses have long been erected in many nations, and coastal countries typically have a navy and some form of coast guard.

Tourism 
Coasts, especially those with beaches and warm water, attract tourists often leading to the development of seaside resort communities. In many island nations such as those of the Mediterranean, South Pacific Ocean and Caribbean, tourism is central to the economy. Coasts offer recreational activities such as swimming, fishing, surfing, boating, and sunbathing. 

Growth management and coastal management can be a challenge for coastal local authorities who often struggle to provide the infrastructure required by new residents, and poor management practices of construction often leave these communities and infrastructure vulnerable to processes like coastal erosion and sea level rise. In many of these communities, management practices such as beach nourishment or when the coastal infrastructure is no longer financially sustainable, managed retreat to remove communities from the coast.

Ecosystem services

Types

Emergent coastline

According to one principle of classification, an emergent coastline is a coastline that has experienced a fall in sea level, because of either a global sea-level change, or local uplift. Emergent coastlines are identifiable by the coastal landforms, which are above the high tide mark, such as raised beaches. In contrast, a submergent coastline is one where the sea level has risen, due to a global sea-level change, local subsidence, or isostatic rebound. Submergent coastlines are identifiable by their submerged, or "drowned" landforms, such as rias (drowned valleys) and fjords

Concordant coastline

According to the second principle of classification, a concordant coastline is a coastline where bands of different rock types run parallel to the shore. These rock types are usually of varying resistance, so the coastline forms distinctive landforms, such as coves. Discordant coastlines feature distinctive landforms because the rocks are eroded by the ocean waves. The less resistant rocks erode faster, creating inlets or bay; the more resistant rocks erode more slowly, remaining as headlands or outcroppings.

Rivieras
Riviera is an Italian word for "shoreline", ultimately derived from Latin ripa ("riverbank"). It came to be applied as a proper name to the coast of the Ligurian Sea, in the form riviera ligure, then shortened to riviera.  Historically, the Ligurian Riviera extended from Capo Corvo (Punta Bianca) south of Genoa, north and west into what is now French territory past Monaco and sometimes as far as Marseilles. Today, this coast is divided into the Italian Riviera and the French Riviera, although the French use the term "Riviera" to refer to the Italian Riviera and call the French portion the "Côte d'Azur".

As a result of the fame of the Ligurian rivieras, the term came into English to refer to any shoreline, especially one that is sunny, topographically diverse and popular with tourists. Such places using the term include the Australian Riviera in Queensland and the Turkish Riviera along the Aegean Sea.

Other coastal categories
 A cliffed coast or abrasion coast is one where marine action has produced steep declivities known as cliffs.
 A flat coast is one where the land gradually descends into the sea.
 A graded shoreline is one where wind and water action has produced a flat and straight coastline.

Landforms 
The following articles describe some coastal landforms:

 Barrier island
 Bay
 Headland
 Cove
 Peninsula

Cliff erosion
 Much of the sediment deposited along a coast is the result of erosion of a surrounding cliff, or bluff. Sea cliffs retreat landward because of the constant undercutting of slopes by waves. If the slope/cliff being undercut is made of unconsolidated sediment it will erode at a much faster rate than a cliff made of bedrock.
 A natural arch is formed when a headland is eroded through by waves.
 Sea caves are made when certain rock beds are more susceptible to erosion than the surrounding rock beds because of different areas of weakness. These areas are eroded at a faster pace creating a hole or crevice that, through time, by means of wave action and erosion, becomes a cave.
 A stack is formed when a headland is eroded away by wave and wind action.
 A stump is a shortened sea stack that has been eroded away or fallen because of instability.
 Wave-cut notches are caused by the undercutting of overhanging slopes which leads to increased stress on cliff material and a greater probability that the slope material will fall. The fallen debris accumulates at the bottom of the cliff and is eventually removed by waves.
 A wave-cut platform forms after erosion and retreat of a sea cliff has been occurring for a long time. Gently sloping wave-cut platforms develop early on in the first stages of cliff retreat. Later, the length of the platform decreases because the waves lose their energy as they break further offshore.

Coastal features formed by sediment

 Beach
 Beach cusps
 Cuspate foreland
 Dune system
 Mudflat
 Raised beach
 Ria
 Shoal
 Spit
 Strand plain
 Surge channel
 Tombolo

Coastal features formed by another feature
 Estuary
  Lagoon
 Salt marsh
Mangrove forests
Kelp forests
Coral reefs
Oyster reefs

Other features on the coast

 Concordant coastline
 Discordant coastline
 Fjord
 Island
 Island arc
 Machair

Coastal waters

"Coastal waters" (or "coastal seas") is a rather general term used differently in different contexts, ranging geographically from the waters within a few kilometers of the coast, through to the entire continental shelf which may stretch for more than a hundred kilometers from land. Thus the term coastal waters is used in a slightly different way in discussions of legal and economic boundaries (see territorial waters and international waters) or when considering the geography of coastal landforms or the ecological systems operating through the continental shelf (marine coastal ecosystems). The research on coastal waters often divides into these separate areas too. 

The dynamic fluid nature of the ocean means that all components of the whole ocean system are ultimately connected, although certain regional classifications are useful and relevant. The waters of the continental shelves represent such a region. The term “coastal waters” has been used in a wide variety of different ways in different contexts. In European Union environmental management it extends from the coast to just a few nautical miles while in the United States the US EPA considers this region to extend much further offshore. 

"Coastal waters" has specific meanings in the context of commercial coastal shipping, and somewhat different meanings in the context of naval littoral warfare. Oceanographers and marine biologists have yet other takes. Coastal waters have a wide range of marine habitats from enclosed estuaries to the open waters of the continental shelf.   

Similarly, the term littoral zone has no single definition. It is the part of a sea, lake, or river that is close to the shore. In coastal environments, the littoral zone extends from the high water mark, which is rarely inundated, to shoreline areas that are permanently submerged.

Coastal waters can be threatened by coastal eutrophication and harmful algal blooms.

In geology 
The identification of bodies of rock formed from sediments deposited in shoreline and nearshore environments (shoreline and nearshore facies) is extremely important to geologists. These provide vital clues for reconstructing the geography of ancient continents (paleogeography). The locations of these beds show the extent of ancient seas at particular points in geological time, and provide clues to the magnitudes of tides in the distant past.

Sediments deposited in the shoreface are preserved as lenses of sandstone in which the upper part of the sandstone is coarser than the lower part (a coarsening upwards sequence). Geologists refer to these are parasequences. Each records an episode of retreat of the ocean from the shoreline over a period of 10,000 to 1,000,000 years. These often show laminations reflecting various kinds of tidal cycles.

Some of the best-studied shoreline deposits in the world are found along the former western shore of the Western Interior Seaway, a shallow sea that flooded central North America during the late Cretaceous Period (about 100 to 66 million years ago). These are beautifully exposed along the Book Cliffs of Utah and Colorado.

Geologic processes
The following articles describe the various geologic processes that affect a coastal zone:

 Attrition
 Currents
 Denudation
 Deposition
 Erosion
 Flooding
 Longshore drift
 Marine sediments
 Saltation
 Sea level change
 eustatic
 isostatic
 Sedimentation
 Coastal sediment supply
 sediment transport
 solution
 subaerial processes
 suspension
 Tides
 Water waves
 diffraction
 refraction
 wave breaking
 wave shoaling
 Weathering

Wildlife

Animals

Larger animals that live in coastal areas include puffins, sea turtles and rockhopper penguins, among many others. Sea snails and various kinds of barnacles live on rocky coasts and scavenge on food deposited by the sea. Some coastal animals are used to humans in developed areas, such as dolphins and seagulls who eat food thrown for them by tourists. Since the coastal areas are all part of the littoral zone, there is a profusion of marine life found just off-coast, including sessile animals such as corals, sponges, starfish, mussels, seaweeds, fishes, and sea anemones.

There are many kinds of seabirds on various coasts. These include pelicans and cormorants, who join up with terns and oystercatchers to forage for fish and shellfish. There are sea lions on the coast of Wales and other countries.

Coastal fish

Plants
Many coastal areas are famous for their kelp beds. Kelp is a fast-growing seaweed that can grow up to half a meter a day in ideal conditions. Mangroves, seagrasses, macroalgal beds, and salt marsh are important coastal vegetation types in tropical and temperate environments respectively. Restinga is another type of coastal vegetation.

Threats 

Coasts also face many human-induced environmental impacts and coastal development hazards. The most important ones are: 
 Pollution which can be in the form of water pollution, nutrient pollution (leading to coastal eutrophication and harmful algal blooms), oil spills or marine debris that is contaminating coasts with plastic and other trash.
 Sea level rise, and associated issues like coastal erosion and saltwater intrusion.

Pollution 

The pollution of coastlines is connected to marine pollution which can occur from a number of sources: Marine debris (garbage and industrial debris); the transportation of petroleum in tankers, increasing the probability of large oil spills; small oil spills created by large and small vessels, which flush bilge water into the ocean.

Marine pollution

Marine debris

Microplastics

Sea level rise due to climate change

Global goals 
International attention to address the threats of coasts has been captured in Sustainable Development Goal 14 "Life Below Water" which sets goals for international policy focused on preserving marine coastal ecosystems and supporting more sustainable economic practices for coastal communities. Likewise, the United Nations has declared 2021-2030 the UN Decade on Ecosystem Restoration, but restoration of coastal ecosystems has received insufficient attention.

See also

 Bank (geography)
 Beach cleaning
 Coastal and Estuarine Research Federation
 European Atlas of the Seas
 Intertidal zone
 Land reclamation
 List of countries by length of coastline
 List of U.S. states by coastline
 Offshore or Intertidal zone
 Ballantine Scale
 Coastal path
 Shorezone

References

External links
 Woods Hole Oceanographic Institution - organization dedicated to ocean research, exploration, and education

 
Coastal and oceanic landforms
Coastal geography
Oceanographical terminology
Articles containing video clips